Panagiotis Adraktas (Greek:  Παναγιώτης Αδράκτας, born  September 28, 1948) is a Greek politician.  He was born in Kardamas in northwestern Elis.  He is a doctor and doctorate at the Medical Faculty of the University of Athens.  He was elected in the 2nd Athens constituency in June 1989, November 1989 and 1990.  He returned to Ilia and ran as a politician in 2000, 2004 and 2007 as a member of the New Democracy party.  He was a municipal counselor in Chaidari between 1980 and 1986 and Peristeri in 1990.

References 
The first version of the article is translated and is based from the article at the Greek Wikipedia (el:Main Page)

Εξωτερικές συνδέσεις 
Main page of Panagiotis Adraktas 

1948 births
Living people
Politicians from Elis
National and Kapodistrian University of Athens alumni
Greek MPs 1989 (June–November)
Greek MPs 1989–1990
Greek MPs 1990–1993
Greek MPs 2000–2004
Greek MPs 2004–2007
Greek MPs 2007–2009
People from Amaliada